Dean Goldfine (born March 8, 1965 in Chicago, Illinois) is a tennis coach and former professional tennis player from the United States.

Coaching career
Goldfine was professional tennis player Todd Martin's coach from 1996 to 2002. Under his tutelage, Martin achieved a career-high rank of No. 4 in the ATP singles ranking, reached the US Open final, and qualified for the ATP year-end championship in 1999.

Goldfine has also coached Xavier Malisse and Aaron Krickstein on the ATP Tour, and Mary Joe Fernandez on the WTA Tour.

In 2003, the USTA named Goldfine as one of its USA Tennis High Performance Coaches. At the 2004 Olympics in Athens, he was sent as team coach for the USA tennis team alongside Patrick McEnroe. Goldfine was also involved in USA Davis Cup coaching activities as an assistant coach.

In the 2004 tennis off-season after the U.S.'s Davis Cup final against Spain, USA Davis Cup stalwart Andy Roddick hired Goldfine to replace Brad Gilbert as his full-time coach. Under Goldfine's coaching, Roddick won five titles (each on a different surface) and reached the 2005 Australian Open semifinal and 2005 Wimbledon final. In February 2006, Goldfine and Roddick decided to part ways amicably.

After retiring from his professional coaching career, Dean started coaching top juniors in South Florida, including Roy Lederman, Ryan Smith, David Omsky, and of course his most notable pupil, Leah Bush

In 2022, he became a traveling coach for professional player Ben Shelton.

Playing career
In high school, Goldfine played number one for Chaminade-Madonna College Preparatory School. Goldfine played varsity tennis at Texas A&M University from 1983 to 1987. In 1989, he reached a career-high ATP Tour singles ranking of 628.

Personal
In 2000, Goldfine launched the Pat Goldfine Tennis Pro-Am, a charity fundraiser for cancer research, in memory of his mother who died of breast and lung cancer.

Goldfine resides in Hollywood, Florida, son Max and daughter Emma.

References

 
 "USA Tennis High Performance names new men's coaching staff", United States Tennis Association, August 3, 2003. Retrieved December 10, 2005.
 "Roddick, Gilbert issue statements on firing" by Richard Pagliaro, Tennis Week, December 14, 2004. Retrieved December 11, 2005.
 "Breaking news from Team Roddick" by AndyRoddick.com Staff, AndyRoddick.com, December 18, 2004. Retrieved December 10, 2005.
 "Divorce Court: Roddick dumps Gilbert after relatively short 'marriage'" by Jerry Magee, San Diego Union-Tribune, December 14, 2004. Retrieved December 11, 2005.
 "Todd Martin to play another year" by Sandra Harwitt, TennisReporters.net, November 25, 2002. Retrieved December 11, 2005.
 "Roddick comfortable with new coach Goldfine" by Sandra Harwitt, TennisReporters.net, January 22, 2005. Retrieved December 10, 2005.
 "Roddick fires Goldfine; brother to coach" by Charles Bricker, SunSentinel.com, February 9, 2006. Retrieved February 9, 2006.

1965 births
Living people
American sports coaches
American tennis coaches
Tennis players from Chicago
Sportspeople from Miami-Dade County, Florida
Tennis people from Florida
Tennis people from Illinois
Texas A&M Aggies men's tennis players
Sports coaches from Illinois
American male tennis players